HSwMS Fenris was a monitor that served with the Swedish Navy from 1872 to 1903. She was an experimental design of small coastal defense monitor and while not seen as a success, experience gained in her development was used in the later Sölve class of monitors. Despite being of the John Ericsson class, she was closest in design to HSwMS Garmer.

Design
She had a coal capacity of nine tons and her propulsion system generated 44 indicated horsepower, with one propeller and one funnel. She was armed with a single  M/65 Dahlgren gun.

Armor

History
Construction of Fenris began in the Norrköping shipyard of engineering company Motala Verkstad in 1871 and she began her service the following year.

References

1872 ships
Ships built in Norrköping
John Ericsson-class monitors of the Swedish Navy